The Suzuki Gladius SFV650 is a naked motorcycle introduced by Suzuki for the 2009 model year with the intention of it being a replacement for the SV650. Subsequently in most countries the half-fairing second-generation SV650S continued to be sold alongside the Gladius until 2014. 

The bike featured a new, more modern-looking aesthetic design, with a tubular trellis-style frame, more similar to the first generation SV650, and an upgraded engine in an effort to increase fuel economy, lower the emissions, and increase peak power and low- to mid-range torque.

At the Tokyo Motor Show in 2009, Suzuki announced they would also be making smaller capacity, 400cc Gladius SFV400 for the Japanese market. 

In 2017 the Gladius was replaced with the third generation SV650.

External links 
Listing at Suzuki website
Motorcycle World.com
Model history at Suzuki website

Gladius
Standard motorcycles
Motorcycles introduced in 2009